Joan Lluís Pons Ramón (born 9 December 1996) is a Spanish swimmer. His speciality is 400 metres medley.

He competed at the 2016 Summer Olympics in Rio de Janeiro. In 2018 he won the silver in 400 m. medley at Mediterranean Games in Tarragona.

References

External links

Living people
Spanish male medley swimmers
Olympic swimmers of Spain
Swimmers at the 2016 Summer Olympics
1996 births
European Aquatics Championships medalists in swimming
Mediterranean Games silver medalists for Spain
Mediterranean Games medalists in swimming
Swimmers at the 2018 Mediterranean Games
Swimmers at the 2020 Summer Olympics